Lickeen Lough is a freshwater lake in the Mid-West Region of Ireland. It is located in The Burren of County Clare.

Geography

Natural history
Fish species in Lickeen Lough include rudd, brown trout, three-spined stickleback and the critically endangered European eel. Arctic char formerly present in the lake are now extinct.

See also
List of loughs in Ireland

References

Lickeen